Sam Bowie (born 30 March 1989 in Thursday Island, Queensland) is an Australian former rugby league footballer who played for the North Queensland Cowboys and the North Queensland Cowboys U20. His position of choice was at fullback.

He made his debut for first grade Cowboys team on 28 June 2008 against the South Sydney Rabbitohs but did not play another first grade match for the club.

References

External links
Cowboys.com.au article

1989 births
Living people
Australian rugby league players
Indigenous Australian rugby league players
North Queensland Cowboys players
Rugby league fullbacks
Rugby league players from Thursday Island